Events from the year 1992 in Belgium

Incumbents
Monarch: Baudouin
Prime Minister: Wilfried Martens (to 7 March); Jean-Luc Dehaene (from 7 March)

Events
 7 February – Belgium a signatory of the Maastricht Treaty
 24 March to 2 April – Dirk Frimout is the first Belgian in Space
 6 June – The 70-point plan (Belgium) is presented by Filip Dewinter Vlaams Blok as an "answer to the problem of immigrants."  It wanted to prove that a policy of return of immigrants could be realised. The plan was heavily criticised because it was considered to be in breach of the European Convention on Human Rights (ECHR).

Publications
 Leo Joseph Suenens, Memories and Hopes (Dublin: Veritas)
 Marcel van Meerhaeghe (ed.), Belgium and EC Membership Evaluated (London and New York)

Births
 11 May – Thibaut Courtois, footballer
 10 July – Jonas Bloquet, actor

Deaths
 19 November – René Tavernier (born 1914), geologist
 12 December – Suzanne Lilar (born 1901), writer
 24 December – Peyo (born Pierre Culliford, 1928), comics artist

References

 
Belgium
Years of the 20th century in Belgium
1990s in Belgium
Belgium